Choristoneura adumbratanus is a species of moth of the family Tortricidae. It is found in Japan, Korea and China (Heilongjiang, Jilin).

The wingspan is 22–26 mm for males and 27–37 mm for females. Adults are on wing from June to August.

The larvae feed on Quercus species (including Quercus acutissima, Quercus cerris), Malus baccata, Malus pumila, Prunus x yedoensis and Salix species.

References

Moths described in 1900
Choristoneura